Lucien-L'Allier station is a Montreal Metro station in the borough of Ville-Marie in Montreal, Quebec, Canada. It is operated by the Société de transport de Montréal (STM) and serves the Orange Line.

Overview

The station, planned under the name "Aqueduc", was designed by the firm of David, Boulva & Cleve. A sculptural grille by Jean-Jacques Besner covering a ventilation shaft is the only artwork. The station is a normal side platform station, with a mezzanine on its eastern end; this is connected to the exit by an extremely deep open shaft. Passengers have to descend the greatest distance to reach the platforms of any station in Montreal (only Charlevoix and Berri-UQAM have deeper platforms, but those stations also have additional platforms that are shallower.)

The station is intermodal with the EXO's commuter train lines; the entrance is connected by an enclosed walkway to Lucien-L'Allier station, a station that serves as the Downtown terminus for the Vaudreuil-Hudson, Saint-Jérôme, and Candiac lines. That train station was built as part of the Bell Centre; it replaced the former Gare Windsor and was initially called Terminus Windsor, but was renamed for the Metro station in order to reduce confusion with the still-extant former station. It is also connected to Montreal's underground city.

Origin of the name
This station is named for Lucien L'Allier Street, whose name was changed from rue de l'Aqueduc in order to commemorate Lucien L'Allier, chief engineer for the initial network of the Metro, as well as for the construction of Saint Helen's Island and Notre Dame Island for Expo 67. He had died while the station was under construction. A plaque in the station commemorates him.

Connecting bus routes

Nearby points of interest

Connected via the underground city
Terminus Centre-Ville
Lucien-L'Allier station
Bell Centre / Montreal Canadiens
Edifice Gare Windsor / Canadian Pacific Railway
Le 1250 René-Lévesque
Bonaventure Metro station and points east

Other
Cité du commerce électronique
Concordia University / Fine Arts pavilion
YWCA

References

External links

Lucien-L'Allier station web site
Montreal by Metro, metrodemontreal.com - photos, information, and trivia
2011 STM system map
2011 Downtown System Map
Metro Map

Orange Line (Montreal Metro)
Railway stations in Canada opened in 1980
Downtown Montreal
1980 establishments in Quebec